Cardamine occidentalis is a species of Cardamine known by the common name big western bittercress. It is native to western North America from Alaska to northwestern California, where it grows in moist mountain habitats.

Description
Cardamine occidentalis is a perennial herb growing from very small rhizomes. It produces a branching erect or leaning stem which may root at nodes. There is a basal array of leaves, each on a petiole and divided into many leaflets. There are also several leaves along the stem. The flower has white petals each a few millimeters long. The fruit is a silique 2 to 3 centimeters long.

External links
Jepson Manual Treatment - Cardamine occidentalis
Cardamine occidentalis - USDA Plants Profile

occidentalis
Flora of Alaska
Flora of California
Flora of the West Coast of the United States
Flora without expected TNC conservation status